The 2004 West Asian Football Federation Championship took part in Iranian Capital of Tehran. Iran won the final against Syria 4–1. The 6 entrants were Iraq, Iran, Syria, Palestine, Lebanon and Jordan. The finals took place between 17 and 25 June 2004.

Venue

Group stage

Group A

Group B

Knockout phase

Semi-finals

Third place match

Final

Champion

External links
 RSSSF Page on the tournament

2004
2004
2004 in Asian football
2003–04 in Iranian football
2003–04 in Iraqi football
2003–04 in Jordanian football
2003–04 in Syrian football
2003–04 in Lebanese football
2004 in Palestinian football